Lyrnai was a town of ancient Lycia, which per the Stadiasmus Patarensis was in the territory of Octapolis and the destination of a road from Calynda.
 
Its site is unlocated.

References

Populated places in ancient Lycia
Former populated places in Turkey
Lost ancient cities and towns